Waymouth Street, often spelt as Weymouth Street in the early days, is an east–west street running between King William Street and West Terrace in the Adelaide city centre in South Australia. The street is named after Henry Waymouth, a founding director of the South Australian Company, whose name was also sometimes spelt as Weymouth.

Description

The street runs between King William Street and West Terrace, on the western side of the city centre. It is intersected by Light Square.

Eastern section
The section of Waymouth Street from King William Street to Light Square is lined by commercial office buildings with many restaurants and cafes at ground level. It is the location of the state headquarters of organisations including ANZ, the Department for Environment and Water, Beyond Bank Australia, Ernst & Young and News Corp Australia. At the intersection with King William Street, there is a pedestrian scramble crossing and a Glenelg tram line stop named after Pirie Street, which continues to the east.

Central section
Waymouth Street forms the southern boundary of Light Square, an open grassy park in the centre of the north-west quadrant of the city centre. This section of Waymouth Street is one-way traffic to the west; east-bound traffic must detour around the square. Traffic signals control the intersection with Morphett Street where it divides to go around the square. A few bars, nightclubs and restaurants are located on the southern side of Waymouth Street, and around Light Square.

Western section
The section from Light Square to West Terrace has lower scale retail and residential buildings, including several hotels, hostels, car and furniture dealerships. Across from the intersection with West Terrace is a service road for Adelaide High School and an entrance point to shared pedestrian and bicycle tracks in the western parklands.

History
The street was named after Henry Waymouth, a founding director of the South Australian Company, by the Street Naming Committee in 1837. Until 1863 it was almost invariably spelled "Weymouth"; the eponymous director was then given either spelling interchangeably.

Incidents
On 2 March 1994, a bomb exploded in the National Crime Authority offices in a building on Waymouth Street, after being sent to NCA Senior Investigator Det.-Sgt Geoffrey Bowen, killing him and severely injuring lawyer Peter Wallis. The initial suspect, Domenic Perre, who was released for lack of evidence shortly after being arrested, was re-arrested in 2018. Perre was standing on top of a nearby carpark and was later arrested at his house. He entered a plea (of not guilty) for the first time in the Adelaide Magistrates Court on 17 February 2020 but his lawyer conceded that there is a case to answer and he was committed to stand trial in the Supreme Court of South Australia.

See also

References

Further reading
Trove search results for newspapers

Streets in Adelaide